St Senan's are a Gaelic Athletic Association Gaelic football club from just outside Listowel in north County Kerry, Ireland. They play North Kerry Division 1, County League Division 3 and Premier Junior Championship Football. They won the Kerry Junior Football Championship in 1985 and 1996. St Senan's won the North Kerry Senior Football Championship for the first time in 2018 and retained the title in 2019.

History

St Senan's won the North Kerry Senior Football Championship for the first time in the club's history after defeating the reigning champions Ballydonughue in Con Brosnan Park, Moyvane on 9 December 2018. The "Saints" successfully thwarted Ballydonughue's attempt at winning three consecutive titles, a feat not achieved in over 40 years within the district. Not only did St Senan's win the championship but they also won Division 1 of the North Kerry League beating Brosna after extra time in a keenly contested game.

Achievements
 Kerry Junior Football Championship Winners (2) 1985, 1996
 Kerry Novice Football Championship Winners (2) 1984, 2015
 North Kerry Senior Football Championship Winners (1) 2018, 2019  Runners-Up 1980, 2000, 2016

All-Ireland winners

All-Ireland Junior Football Championship

  David Foran (1): 2016
 John Walsh (1): 1994

All-Ireland Minor Football Championship

 Barry Mahoney (1): 2017

References

External links
 Official website

Gaelic games clubs in County Kerry
Gaelic football clubs in County Kerry